The 81st Rifle Division was an infantry division of the Red Army during World War II.

It was established at Lubny (Kiev or Kharkov Military Districts) around 1936. As 81st Mechanised Division, part of 4th Mechanised Corps, with 6th Army, Southwestern Front, in June 1941. Fought at Voronezh and Kursk. With Soviet 1st Guards Army of the 4th Ukrainian Front 5.45.

References

Robert G. Poirier and Albert Z. Conner, The Red Army Order of Battle in the Great Patriotic War, Novato: Presidio Press, 1985. .

081
Military units and formations established in 1936